Anolyn Lulu (born 3 January 1979) is a Ni-Vanuatu table tennis player who competed in 2012 Summer Olympics. She was the flag-bearer for Vanuatu at the opening ceremony of the 2012 Summer Olympics.

References

External links
 

Table tennis players at the 2012 Summer Olympics
1979 births
People from Penama Province
Vanuatuan female table tennis players
Olympic table tennis players of Vanuatu
Living people
Commonwealth Games competitors for Vanuatu
Table tennis players at the 2014 Commonwealth Games
Table tennis players at the 2018 Commonwealth Games